The Sierra Pacific Synod is one of the 65 synods of the Evangelical Lutheran Church in America (ELCA). It covers central and northern California and northern Nevada and supports ELCA congregations throughout that region. It is headed by a bishop, most recently by Megan Rohrer who resigned on June 6, 2022.

It is subdivided into nine conferences, each headed by a dean.
 Redwood Mountain covering the northernmost part of the synod
 Bridges covering the north and northeastern parts of the San Francisco Bay area
 Capitol Valley covers congregations around the California state capital, Sacramento
 Sierra Nevada Foothill covers congregations in the Sierra Nevada mountains and also Nevada.  
 San Francisco Peninsula covers congregations from San Francisco to Mountain View
 El Camino Real covers congregations from Sunnyvale south along the coast.
 Mt. Diablo covers the south and interior parts of the east side of the San Francisco Bay area.  
 Sierra Central Valley covers the California Central Valley south of Sacramento but north of Fresno.
 Central San Joaquin Valley covers the Fresno area

The synod, like many ELCA synods, is a companion of a non-US Lutheran church. Sierra Pacific's companions are the Taiwan Lutheran Church, the Lutheran Church of Rwanda, and the Salvadoran Lutheran Church.

Bishops current and former:
 Robert W. Mattheis (1994–2002), resigned due to illness
 David G. Mullen (2002–2008)
 Mark W. Holmerud (2008–2021)
 Megan Rohrer (2021–2022)
 Interim Bishop Claire S. Burkat (2022-present)

Well known churches in the synod include St. Francis Lutheran Church and First United Lutheran Church. Both were suspended from the denomination in 1990 and then expelled in 1995 for ordaining gay and lesbian pastors. After the ELCA changed its rules on ordaining gay and lesbian pastors in 2009, they rejoined in 2011 and 2012 respectively.

References

Evangelical Lutheran Church in America synods